NGY, nGy or ngy may refer to:

 Nagyágite, a rare sulfide mineral (IMA symbol: NGY)
 nanogray, a unit of absorbed dose of ionising radiation equal to 10 Gray (unit) (symbol: nGy)
 Papua New Guinea, a country in Oceania (IOC country code 1976-1980: NGY)
 Suriname, a country in South America (former FIFA country code: NGY)
 Tibea language, also known as Ngayaba, a language spoken in Cameroon (ISO 639-3: ngy)